Croatia–Cyprus relations are foreign relations between Croatia and Cyprus. Both countries established diplomatic relations on February 4, 1993. The Croatian embassy in Rome (Italy) is also accredited as a non resident embassy to Cyprus. Croatia has an honorary consulate in Nicosia. The Cypriot embassy in Vienna (Austria) is also accredited as a non resident embassy to Croatia. Cyprus has an honorary consulate in Zagreb. 
Both countries are full members of the European Union and Council of Europe. 
Both Cyprus joined the EU in 2004, and Croatia joined the EU in 2013.

See also
Foreign relations of Croatia
Foreign relations of Cyprus
2004 enlargement of the European Union
2013 enlargement of the European Union
Cypriots in Croatia
Croats in Cyprus
Cyprus–Yugoslavia relations

Links
 Croatian Ministry of Foreign Affairs: list of bilateral treaties with Cyprus

 
Cyprus
Croatia